Bryan S. Pittman (born January 20, 1977) is a former American football long snapper. He was signed by the Texans as an undrafted free agent in 2003. He played college football at Washington.

Pittman played semi professionally for the Puget Sound Jets of the North West Football League for three seasons before breaking into the National Football League in 2003 with the Cleveland Browns.

Pittman has been a member of the Seattle Seahawks, Atlanta Falcons and Houston Texans.

Bryan currently resides in Sugar Land, Texas where he has established a successful insurance agency.

Early years
Pittman attended Thomas Jefferson High School in Auburn, Washington. He was a three-year letterman in Football and Track for the Raiders.

Bryan Pittman was discovered and seen at well-known specialist coach Paul Assad's free agent camp in Reno, Nevada by Jerry Rosburg, special teams coach of the Cleveland Browns.  Pittman's 15 yard punt snaps were clocked at 0.55 seconds, the fastest to date by a long snapper at an official combine event.  Normal times are between 0.68–0.70 seconds.  Cleveland had drafted a long snapper so after the last cuts of pre-season, Pittman was picked up by the Houston Texans by coach Joe Marciano who had seen Pittman at Paul Assad's event.  Pittman went on to play for seven years in the NFL.

College career
Pittman attended Walla Walla Community College. In football, he was the team's long snapper and also started for two years at tight end. He then transferred to the University of Washington.

References

External links
Houston Texans bio

1977 births
Living people
Players of American football from Tacoma, Washington
American football tight ends
American football long snappers
Washington Huskies football players
Houston Texans players
Seattle Seahawks players
Atlanta Falcons players
People from Auburn, Washington
Walla Walla Warriors football players